Two ships of the Royal Navy have borne the name HMS Artois. The name entered the navy with the capture of the French frigate Artois:

  was a 40-gun fifth rate captured from the French in 1780 and sold in 1786.
  was a 38-gun fifth rate launched in 1794 and wrecked in 1797.

References
 

Royal Navy ship names